Beatrice Moses Hinkle (1874–1953) was a pioneering American feminist, psychoanalyst, writer, and translator.

Early life and marriage
Hinkle was born in San Francisco, California, to physician B. Frederick Moses and Elizabeth Benchley Van Geisen.  In 1892 she married Walter Scott Hinkle, an assistant district attorney.  Hinkle had considered studying law, but after being discouraged by her husband "with a good hardy laugh", she entered Cooper Medical College (now part of Stanford University) in 1895.

Writing
In 1905 Hinkle became the first woman physician in the country to hold a public health position (McHenry, 1980). She was appointed as San Francisco's city physician. This particular fact was very important in her career because this was the very first time a female doctor was given such a responsibility.  In 1908 she moved East to New York City and (along with Dr. Charles R. Dana) founded the country's first therapeutic clinic in the United States in 1908 at Cornell Medical School (McHenry 1980). In 1909 she decided to study with Freud and left for Vienna. While she admired Freud's contributions to psychoanalysis, she later broke with his teachings finding herself at odds with the rigid sexual hypotheses of the strictly Freudian analysts (Karier, 1986). Freud's lack of recognition to women's psychological autonomy led her to change her mind about Freud's understanding of the human psyche. Thus Freud's thinking pushed her to align herself with the psychoanalytic group that supported Carl Jung's theories. Tired of hearing Freud's assertion that female psyche was a derivation of the male's, Dr. Hinkle returned to New York in 1915 determined to spread Jung's words in America.

One of Dr. Beatrice Moses Hinkle's major distinction is that she was the first to present Carl Jung's writing to the English-speaking world. Jung's consideration of the female psyche as independent from males, attracted the admiration of Dr. Hinkle in such degree that she became the official translator of his work in America. In 1916 she translated Psychology of the Unconscious: A Study of the Transformations and Symbolisms of the Libido. She was a fundamental part of the book since her own ideas were included in this work. She renewed these theories and remained a constant contributor. Dr. Hinkle added several theories of her own that were constructed through her personal experience with both Freud and Jung. She broadened the context of terms such as "complex" and "repression." She explained that " This important group of ideas or impressions, those that come out from the patient's mind while being psychoanalyzed, with the feelings and emotions clustered around them which are betrayed through this painful process, was called by Jung a complex" (Hinkle, 1916, p. 14).

Dr. Hinkle thought that one of the most attractive parts of Jung's theories was referred to the relief for those in revolt against the repressive character of the patriarchal society that under girded Freud's worldview (Karier, 1986). In this aspect, Jung proposed that the mother is the real dominant figure in the child's life and not the father as proposed by Freud. This also allowed for a break with the masculine dominance of Freudian psychology without blurring the traditional distinctions between masculine and feminine psychosexual roles. About this particular Jung's assertion, Dr. Hinkle expressed: "Jung's development of this point of view shows very clearly that, just as the problem of the father is the great fact of Freud's psychology, the problem of the mother is the essence of Jung's, with the struggle carried on between the two great forces of love and power" (Karier, 1986, p. 291). Thus Jung's consideration of the female psyche as independent from males, attracted the admiration of Dr. Hinkle in such degree that she became the official translator of his work in America.

Hinkle was a member of the Greenwich Village based feminist network, the Heterodoxy Club, lending credence to the group by being the only professionally trained and practicing psychoanalyst.  It was as a member of this group that she began writing, including occasional contributions to Progressive Education Survey and Harper's Magazine.  Her themes included women's rights, women's suffrage, and issues of divorce, individualism, and legal status.  She wrote often of the need for women to liberate themselves from what she called the "psychic bondage" of women to men.

Her book, The Re-Creating of the Individual: A Study of Psychological Types and Their Relation to Psychoanalysis, was favorably reviewed in The New York Times in 1923.  In addition to her own writing and Jung translations, she also contributed to the books The Book of Marriage by Hermann von Keyserling, and Our Changing Morality by Freda Kirchwey.

Her autobiographical essay was published in 2003 in These Modern Women: Autobiographical Essays from the Twenties, edited by Elaine Showalter.

Bibliography

Books
The Re-Creating of the Individual: A Study of Psychological Types and Their Relation to Psychoanalysis (George Allen & Unwin, London, 1923).
Carl Jung, Psychology of the Unconscious : A Study of the Transformations and Symbolisms of the Libido, (translated 1916).

Partial list of articles
The Chaos of Modern Marriage, December 1925 (Harper's Magazine)
Woman's Subjective Dependence Upon Man, January 1932 (Harper's Magazine)

Further reading
Showalter, Elaine, ed. These Modern Women: Autobiographical Essays from the Twenties Second Edition, The Feminist Press at City University of New York, 2003.  
 Jay Sherry, “Beatrice Hinkle and the Early History of Jungian Psychology in New York”, Behav Sci (Basel). 2013 Sep; 3(3): 492–500.

References
Harper's Magazine articles
Wittenstein, Kate.  The feminist uses of psychoanalysis: Beatrice M. Hinkle and the foreshadowing of modern feminism in the United States. Journal of Women's History, Summer 1998, Vol. 10 Issue 2.

American psychiatrists
American feminists
1874 births
1953 deaths
Writers from San Francisco
Analysands of Sigmund Freud
20th-century American women writers
20th-century American writers
19th-century American women writers
19th-century American writers
American women psychiatrists